Kurudu Island is an island which lies east of Yapen Island in Cenderawasih Bay, lying off the north coast of Papua Province of Indonesia. It covers an area of 21.49 km2 and had a population of 1,585 at the 2020 Census. Administratively, the island forms a district (distrik) within the Yapen Islands Regency, and is sub-divided into 8 villages (desa) of which the administrative centre is Kirimbri. Its inhabitants speak the Kurudu language, one of the Yapen languages.

References

Yapen Islands